Jonathan Mexique (born 10 March 1995) is a French footballer who plays as a midfielder for Châteauroux.

Club career
On 24 June 2021, he signed a three-year contract with Châteauroux.

International career
Mexique was born in mainland France and is of Martiniquais descent. He is a former youth international for France. He was called up to the Martinique national team for 2022–23 CONCACAF Nations League matches in June 2022.

Career statistics

References

External links
 

1995 births
Living people
Association football midfielders
French footballers
France youth international footballers
French people of Martiniquais descent
Le Mans FC players
AS Monaco FC players
Red Star F.C. players
Cercle Brugge K.S.V. players
Tours FC players
SO Cholet players
LB Châteauroux players
Ligue 2 players
Championnat National players
Challenger Pro League players
French expatriate footballers
Expatriate footballers in Belgium
French expatriate sportspeople in Belgium